The United States Air Force's 693rd Intelligence, Surveillance and Reconnaissance Group is an intelligence unit located at Ramstein Air Base, Germany.

Mission
The mission of the 693rd Intelligence, Surveillance and Reconnaissance Group is to lead theater Air Force ISR operations through effective planning, collection, analysis, and dissemination, enabling theater and national warfighters to secure global vigilance, reach, and power.

History

Lineage
 Established as the 693rd Electronic Security Wing on 21 June 1988
 Activated on 7 July 1988
 Inactivated on 1 October 1991
 Redesignated 693 Intelligence Wing and activated on 1 October 1991
 Inactivated on 1 October 1993
 Redesignated 693 Intelligence Group on 21 June 2007
 Activated on 12 July 2007
 Redesignated 693 Intelligence, Surveillance, and Reconnaissance Group on 1 January 2009

Assignments
 European Electronic Security Division 7 July 1988
 Air Force Intelligence Command, 1 October 1991 – 1 October 1993
 70th Intelligence Wing, 12 July 2007
 480th Intelligence Wing (later 480th intelligence, Surveillance and Reconnaissance Wing), 23 July 2008 – present

Components
 Groups
 6950th Electronic Security Group (later 450th Intelligence Squadron), 7 July 1988 – 23 July 1991, 12 July 2007 – present
 6960th Electronic Security Group, c. 1 October 1991 – c. 1 October 1993

 Squadrons
 24th Intelligence Squadron, 1 April 2008 – present 
 402nd Intelligence Squadron, 1 October 2011 – present
 Darmstadt, Germany
 450th Intelligence Squadron (see 6950th Electronic Security Group)
 485th Intelligence Squadron, 12 July 2007 – present
 Mainz-Kastel, Germany
 600th Electronic Security Squadron, 27 August 1992 – 1 October 1993
 Langley Air Force Base, Virginia
 693rd Intelligence Support Squadron, 1 June 2010 – present
 6906th Electronic Security Squadron, 1 October 1991 – 1 October 1993
 Brooks Air Force Base, Panama
 6933rd Electronic Security Squadron, 1 October 1991 – 1 October 1993
 Howard Air Force Base, Panama
 6947th Electronic Security Squadron, 1 October 1991 – 1 October 1993
 Naval Air Station Key West, Florida
 6948th Electronic Security Squadron, 1 October 1991 – 1 October 1993
 6949th Electronic Security Squadron, 1 October 1991 – 1 October 1993
 Offutt Air Force Base, nebraska
 6951st Electronic Security Squadron, 1 May 1991 – 1 October 1991
 RAF Harrogate, England
 6952nd Electronic Security Squadron, c. 1 May 1991 – c. 1 October 1991
 RAF Lakenheath, England
 Electronic Security Squadron, Provisional, 6975th, attached c. 1 May 1991 – c. 1 October 1991
 Prince Sultan Air Base, Saudi Arabia
 6993rd Electronic Security Squadron, 1 October 1991 – 1 October 1993

Stations
 RAF Chicksands, United Kingdom, 7 July 1988
 Kelly Air Force Base, Texas, 1 October 1991 – 1 October 1993
 Ramstein Air Base, Germany, 12 July 2007 – present

Awards

References

Notes
 Explanatory notes

 Citations

Bibliography

External links
 Air Force Intelligence, Surveillance and Reconnaissance Agency
 Air Force Historical Research Agency: 693rd Intelligence, Surveillance and Reconnaissance Group

Intelligence groups of the United States Air Force